The Electricity Power House is a heritage-listed electrical substation located at 23 Albany Street, Crows Nest, North Sydney Council, New South Wales, Australia. It was built in 1927 . It is also known as Electricity Sub-Station No. 187. The property is owned by Ausgrid, an agency of the Government of New South Wales. It was added to the New South Wales State Heritage Register on 2 April 1999.

History 
The Crows Nest substation is a purpose built structure dating from 1927. An MCS logo appears on the facade in relief.

Description 
The Crows Nest substation is a large dominating three storey building of unusual wide-eaved hipped roof which features mansard roof sections to the corners. It has a brick base course and rendered upper two storeys with recessed central bay which features arch sections with multi paned windows located within. The Crows Nest substation is constructed in load bearing face brick at the lower level and cement render at the upper facade levels. The roof has exposed timber rafters and ceramic tiles.

The substation is complete in the Interwar Georgian Revival style. Exterior materials include face bricks, cement render, ceramic tiled roof, and timber joinery.

Condition 
As at 10 November 2000, the condition of the substation was good.

Heritage listing 
The Crows Nest substation is a rare and representative example of an unusual building design from the interwar period which features mansard roof corners to the main roof, decorative rendered walls with recessed bays and elongated arches to the facades. It is considered to be of state significance.

Electricity Power House was listed on the New South Wales State Heritage Register on 2 April 1999.

See also 

Ausgrid
Australian non-residential architectural styles

References

Attribution 

New South Wales State Heritage Register
Crows Nest, New South Wales
Electric power infrastructure in New South Wales
Articles incorporating text from the New South Wales State Heritage Register
1927 establishments in Australia
Buildings and structures completed in 1927
Energy infrastructure completed in 1927
Buildings and structures in Sydney